Red Bull Street Style World Championship 2019 was a freestyle competition where qualified freestylers took part in the finals of Freestyle Football. Competitors  exhibited their top tricks and unique moves in a 2v2 battle format held over three minutes. The 2019 finals took place at WynWood village, Miami Beach, Florida. It was won by Ricardo Fabiano Chahini in men`s category and Melody Donchet in the women category

Format
To take part in the final competition, the competitor must have been a champion in their country.  Competitors revealed their top tricks and unique moves in a three minute 2v2 battle format. Three minutes in the centre ring, two players, one ball and one winner is announced by the judges. Each participant performs for three 30-second routines, judges looked for creative combination on floor and performing tricks with foot, head and body moves. Scores are based on the quality of execution and control as well as style, energy and rhythm. Competitors can never use their hands and dropped balls are frowned upon.

Contestants

Men`s category

Women category

Champions
Ricardinho  from Brazil won the men`s category while Melody Donchet  from France won the women`s category.

Media
The competition was broadcast in six languages on various television shows and on various social media pages and YouTube channels for both World Football Freestyle Association and Red Bull with over million viewers. Over 3000 spectators attended the event physically.

Judges
The judges in the final competitions were Louis Nani, Pavel Pardo, Daniel Mikolajek, Carlos Iacono and Andrew Henderson.

Venue
The competition took place at Wynwood

Sponsors
The event was sponsored by Red Bull (Title sponsor), others were World Freestyle Football Association, SWRL.

Opening ceremony
The opening ceremony of the 2019 Red Bull Street Style champions took place at Wynwood park on 15 November 2019.

References

External links
Final report
Listo rapero boricua Yartzi para revalidar como el mejor improvisador EE.UU.
Donchet takes third world ball juggling title
Ricardinho gives Brazil its first Red Bull Street Style World Championship

Red Bull sports events